John Paul Cunniff (July 9, 1944 – May 10, 2002) was an American NHL hockey coach and former professional player who appeared in 65 World Hockey Association regular season games between 1972 and 1976. Cunniff was inducted into the United States Hockey Hall of Fame in 2003.

Amateur career
Cunniff was born in South Boston, Massachusetts and attended Boston College, where he was a two-time All-American left wing, and was the 1964 Rookie of the Year, and was the first hockey player ever to be named the Beanpot MVP twice ('64 & '65); a record that lasted for 39 years. He was a dominant scorer, his 71 goals and 82 assists in just 75 games established a Boston College career point record. His 67 points in 1966–67 was best in the nation, and helped the Eagles reach the NCAA Championship finals.

Twice he won All-America honors, was a three-time All-East selection, and a three-time All-New England choice. He was named to the All-Time Boston Garden Beanpot Tournament Team.

Cunniff wore #2 for the Eagles from 1963–66 and registered 153 points—71 goals and 82 assists—in 75 collegiate games. He earned All-America honors in 1965 and 1966.

He joined the U.S. National team in 1967 for the Ice Hockey World Championship tournament in Vienna and also played for the U.S. at the 1968 Olympics in Grenoble.

Professional career
John Cunniff enjoyed a successful professional playing career with the Detroit Red Wings, Boston Bruins, and Quebec Nordiques organizations, and as a member of the New England Whalers in the World Hockey Association in 1972–74. Cunniff played on the New England Whalers team that won the WHA's inaugural championship. He returned to the U.S. national team for the 1975 hockey world championship tournament.

Coaching career
Cunniff served as a player/coach in the North American Hockey League and New England Hockey League before joining the Hartford Whalers as an assistant coach in 1981 after his playing career had ended in 1979. He was named head coach of the Binghamton Whalers the following season and coached the Hartford Whalers during the 1982–83 NHL season.

He then joined the Boston Bruins organization as assistant coach of the Bruins with Terry O'Reilly in the 1987–88 Stanley Cup appearance.  He was head coach of the New Jersey Devils from 1989 to 1991, coached the Albany River Rats, and his name was engraved on the Stanley cup with the Devils in 2000.

His involvement in 13 seasons with the Devils organization includes serving as head coach of the NHL club for two seasons (1989–90 and 1990–91). Prior to joining the Devils' organization, he was an assistant coach with the Boston Bruins for three seasons. In addition, he guided the Hartford Whalers for 13 games as head coach in 1982-83.

Cunniff's extensive experience with USA Hockey includes serving as associate coach during the 1994 Winter Olympic Games in Lillehammer, Norway, assistant coach for the 1998 U.S. Olympic Men's Ice Hockey Team in Nagano, Japan, and assistant coach for the 2002 U.S. Olympic Men's Hockey Team in Salt Lake City, Utah. Cunniff was named assistant coach for the United States team that captured the championship in the 1996 World Cup of Hockey. He was an assistant coach for four U.S. National Teams (1982, 1991, 1992 and 1993) at the International Ice Hockey Federation (IIHF) Men's World Championships, and was an assistant on two U.S. National Junior Teams (1992 and 1993) at the IIHF World Junior Championships. In addition, Cunniff was an assistant coach for Team USA in the 1981 Canada Cup tournament.

Cunniff served as head coach of the Albany River Rats—the top minor-league affiliate of the National Hockey League's New Jersey Devils—for five seasons (1996–2001). He finished in 2000-01 as the AHL's longest tenured head coach at the time. After posting a record of 187-169-39 as head coach with Albany, Cunniff transitioned to New Jersey's scouting staff in 2001.

Cunniff was inducted into the Massachusetts Hockey Hall of Fame in 1997; was named the 1998 Walter Yaciuk Award Winner for his outstanding contribution to USA Hockey's coaching education program and in 2002; was posthumously honored with the USA Hockey Distinguished Achievement Award.

A superb strategist, innovative trainer, and excellent coach, he was among the first U.S. hockey coaches to incorporate international (Russian/European) training and open play-making to successfully coach and mentor some of the best NHL players. He was well known for his voracious reading of military strategy, leadership, and motivational training.

He died from esophageal cancer in Albany, New York and is buried at Cedar Grove Cemetery in Dorchester, Massachusetts.

He was inducted to the Massachusetts Hockey Hall of Fame and the U.S. Hockey Hall of Fame.

He was inducted into the Boston College Varsity Club Athletic Hall of Fame in 1978, and his number was retired to the rafters of Conte Forum at Boston College.

NHL Coaching record

See also
 List of members of the United States Hockey Hall of Fame

Awards and honors

References

External links

1944 births
2002 deaths
American ice hockey coaches
American men's ice hockey left wingers
Baltimore Clippers players
Boston Bruins coaches
Boston College Eagles men's ice hockey players
Cleveland Barons (1937–1973) players
Deaths from cancer in New York (state)
Deaths from esophageal cancer
Fort Worth Wings players
Hartford Whalers coaches
Ice hockey coaches from Massachusetts
Ice hockey players at the 1968 Winter Olympics
Jacksonville Barons players
New England Whalers players
New Jersey Devils coaches
New Jersey Devils scouts
North American Hockey League (1973–1977) coaches
Olympic ice hockey players of the United States
People from South Boston
Quebec Nordiques (WHA) players
Rochester Americans players
Sportspeople from Boston
Springfield Indians players
Stanley Cup champions
United States Hockey Hall of Fame inductees
AHCA Division I men's ice hockey All-Americans
Ice hockey people from Boston